India women's national kabaddi team represents India in international women's Kabaddi events.

Kabaddi is an Indian subcontinent-based contact sport. It is one among India's most popular sports, mostly of village dwellers. In kabaddi, India has competed in four Asian Games and won gold in each of them.
In 1950, the All India Kabaddi Federation was formed, and uniform regulations were developed. In 1973, the Amateur Kabaddi Federation of India (AKFI) was established. The very first men's nationals were held in Tamil Nadu (Chennai) after the foundation of the Amateur Kabaddi Federation of India, while the first women's nationals were held in AKFI has given a new structure to the regulations.

In 2010 and 2014, the Indian women's team won both gold medals at the Asian Games. In 2010 and 2016, the Indian Women's team won both gold medals at the South Asian Games. In 2005, 2007, 2008 and 2017 India's women's Kabaddi team won Asian Kabaddi Championship. In 2012, 2013, 2014 and 2016 India's women's team won the World Cup four times.

Results

World Cup

2012  – 
2013  – 
2014  – 
2016  –

Asian Kabaddi Championship

2005  –  
2007  – 
2008  – 
2017  –

Asian Games

2010  – 
2014  – 
2018  –

South Asian Games

2006  – 
2010  – 
2016  – 
2019  –

External links
 India national women's team want kabaddi at olympics (NDTV)
 Indian women kabaddi team to step in tournament tomorrow (Punjab News)
 Indian women clinch Kabaddi World Cup championship (NDTV Sports)
 Indian National Women Kabaddi Team won first edition of World Cup Kabaddi Title (jagranjosh.com)
 Apologies to Indian women's kabaddi team (India Express)

References

Kabaddi
National women's kabaddi teams
Women's national kabaddi team